IC 4710 is a galaxy in southern constellation of Pavo, roughly 34 million light-years away.

Discovered on August 18, 1900 by astronomer DeLisle Stewart, this galaxy is composed of bright stars, with bright pockets — marking bursts of new star formation — scattered around its edges. It has a diameter of 36,000 light-years.

IC 4710 is classified as a dwarf peculiar galaxy. As the name suggests, such galaxies are irregular and chaotic in appearance, lacking central bulges and spiral arms — they are distinctly different from spirals or ellipticals. It is thought that irregular galaxies may once have been spirals or ellipticals, but became distorted over time through external gravitational forces during interactions or mergers with other galaxies. Dwarf irregulars in particular are important to our overall understanding of galactic evolution, as they are thought to be similar to the first galaxies that formed in the Universe.

IC 4710 lies in the southern constellation of Pavo (The Peacock), which also contains the spiral galaxy which is a Milky Way mimic, NGC 6744.

References 

4710
Dwarf irregular galaxies
Pavo (constellation)